The New South Wales Rugby Union, or NSWRU, is the governing body for the sport of rugby union within most of the state of New South Wales in Australia. It is a member and founding union of Rugby Australia. Within Australia it is considered the strongest Union. It has the largest player base, biggest population, most suburban clubs, and the oldest running club rugby competition in the country.

The southern areas of New South Wales encompassing the Monaro, Far South Coast, and Southern Inland unions are not affiliated  with the NSWRU. They are now within the ACT and Southern NSW Rugby Union. The New South Wales Rugby Union was founded in 1874 as the Southern Rugby Union, before changing to the present name in 1893.

Structure

Clubs

Jurisdiction
Due to the merging of Union's by the ACT and Southern NSW Rugby Union, the New South Wales Rugby Union does not encompass all of New South Wales. However, it does include major cities and towns, making up roughly two-thirds (and/or more) of the state. Such cities and towns include: Newcastle, the Central Coast, Wollongong, Coffs Harbour, Port Macquarie, Tamworth, Orange, Dubbo, Bathurst, Lismore, Tweed Heads, Byron Bay, and Sydney.

See also

Rugby union in New South Wales
New South Wales Waratahs

References

External links
 NSW Rugby Union

Rugby union governing bodies in New South Wales
Rugby Union
1874 establishments in Australia
Sports organizations established in 1874